The 1909–10 season was the 33rd Scottish football season in which Dumbarton competed at national level, entering the Scottish Football League, the Scottish Cup and the Scottish Qualifying Cup. In addition Dumbarton played in the Dumbartonshire Cup.

Story of the season

August
On 16 August Dumbarton opened the season at Boghead with a friendly against county champions Renton. The team lined up as follows: Forrester (goal); Muirhead and Gordon (full backs); Hynds, Lipton and Kane (half backs) and Ritchie, Brander, Gibson, NcNee and Hill (forwards}. Two Brander goals were enough to see the home side began the season with a win.

The opening league tie of the season was played at Boghead on 21 August against Vale of Leven. Hill came in to replace Gibson at centre forward and new signing Spence took over at inside left. The new man scored the opener, but Vale equalised. Dumbarton had the chance to win late on from a penalty and while Ritchie scored, the kick was ordered to be retaken, and he was unable to repeat the task. The game finished 1-1.

The second league fixture was against Raith Rovers a week later at Kirkcaldy. Gordon replaced Kane at left half and O’Neill stepped in at left back, while Hill went to the left wing and Gibson returned at centre forward. Both teams played attacking football, but Raith scored first after a Forrester blunder in goals. Brander equalised before half time but it was the home side who snatched both points with the winning goal in the second half.

September
On 4 September Dumbarton commenced their Qualifying Cup campaign at Millburn Park against the current holders Vale of Leven. An unchanged side took to the field and began strongly with Hill scoring after 20 minutes. Ritchie scored a second in the second half, and despite the Vale replying with a goal five minutes from time the Sons held on to win 2-1.

It was back to league business a week later as Arthurlie were the visitors to Boghead. For the third week running the same team was fielded and despite having the better of the opening play it was Arthurlie who scored first. Hill however replied within five minutes, and at the interval the scores were level. Spence gave Dumbarton back the lead and then Arthurlie equalised once more. However, the Sons had the last word as Ritchie scored the winner in a 3-2 victory.

On 18 September Johnstone were the opponents at Boghead in the second round of the Qualifying Cup. Again no changes were made to the team. The teams met at the same stage of the competition last season when Dumbarton ran out 4-1 winners and this time they went one better. Hill was first to find the mark and although Johnstone equalised it was one way traffic thereafter with Hill again, Ritchie, Brander and Gibson all scoring in a 5-1 win. Johnstone’s task was not helped by one of their backs being hampered by an injury throughout the second half.

During the week Dumbarton signed former internationalist Finlay Speedie (ex Bradford Park Avenue) and goalkeeper Jim McCormick (ex Arthurlie) and both featured in the league match against St Bernards on 25 September at the Gymnasium.  Hynds made way for Speedie, while Gordon replaced Muirhead in the back line with Kane taking over at left half. The home side went into the lead within two minutes, but Gibson equalised and that was all the scoring at half time. The Sons continued to press for a winner in the second half but were unable to break the Saints defence and were caught by a breakaway goal and lost by 2-1.

After four games Dumbarton found themselves down in 9th place in the league with just 3 points – Cowdenbeath led with 9 points from 5 played.

October
On 2 October Dykehead were Dumbarton’s opponents in the third round of the Qualifying Cup at Boghead. Muirhead and Hynds returned to the team. New boy Speedie netted his first of the season followed by a second from Gibson. Although the visitors got a goal back before the interval, Brander scored Dumbarton’s third just a minute into the second half, and with no further goals the Sons won 3-1.

The following week Dumbarton commenced their county cup programme with a home game against Lennox Amateurs. A couple of squad changes were made with Gordon replacing O’Neil in the back line and McNee coming back in place of Gibson at centre forward. The match was a one-sided affair with Dumbarton handing out a 8-0 thrashing. McNee scored four of the goals, Brander had a hat trick, and Spence got the other.

Dumbarton were drawn away to play Bo’ness in the fourth round of the Qualifying Cup on 16 October. An unchanged side was selected. The game was a closely contested affair with only a single goal separating the teams – Ritchie (under the pseudonym Murray) scoring just before half time. McNee was injured and retired with ten minutes of the match to go and Bo’ness missed a penalty.

On 23 October it was back to league business with a home match against Abercorn. During the week Dumbarton had signed half back Willie Lithgow (ex Glasgow Perthshire) and forward David Anderson (ex Ayr). Lithgow replaced Gordon at left back with Gordon being played at right half and Anderson took the place of the injured McNee. In another tough tussle, the goals came in a five-minute spell just after the interval with Hill opening for the Sons and Abercorn equalising – the match ending in a 1-1 draw.

Ayr were next up on 30 October in the last eight of the Qualifying Cup. A number of changes were made to the team – Hynds and Gibson returned in place of Lithgow and Spence respectively. Returnee Gibson struck the only goal which took Dumbarton through to the semi final.

As October came to a close Dumbarton found themselves at the foot of the league table with 4 points from five matches played – but with games in hand over their nearest challengers. Raith Rovers led the way with 11 points.

November
Albion Rovers were the hosts in a league fixture on 6 November. Three changes were made to the team, Lithgow in the defence, Lipton in the half back line and Spence in the attack all returned. The match turned out to be a disappointing one for Dumbarton as the Rovers left wing was in sparking form scoring a hat trick. Brander got a goal back but the game finished in a 3-1 defeat.

On 13 October Dumbarton travelled to line up against Bathgate in the semi final of the Qualifying Cup. More changes were made by the selection committee with the return of O’Neil, Gordon and Anderson. As expected the match was a close contest but the Sons found the Bathgate defence in their best form. Bathgate scored late in the first half but despite chances at both ends this was to be the only score.

Dumbarton resumed league duty on 20 October with the return fixture against Vale of Leven at Millburn Park. Arthur Urquhart had joined the Sons from Johnstone and he was added to the team on the right wing. In the first half Speedie then Brander had Dumbarton two goals to the good, but Vale rallied and had equalised before half time. Vale continued to pressurise the Sons defence in the second half and took the lead, only for Speedie to equalise from a penalty kick. Vale lost their keeper to injury ten minutes from time but held out for a 3-3 draw.

A week later Dumbarton were at home to play Ayr in the league. Kane replacing Anderson at left half was the only team change. The visitors began brightly but rarely tested McCormick in goals. Play switched to the other end and Lipton scored for Dumbarton but Ayr came back to equalise just before half time. This was the state of affairs with 20 minutes to go but a change in the attack by Dumbarton with Hill switching to centre forward had the desired effect as first Brander and then Hill scored for a 3-1 win.

At the end of the month Dumbarton had lifted themselves off the bottom of the league table with 7 points from 8 games played – Raith maintained the lead with 16 points.

December
It was another league match on 4 December as Dumbarton travelled to take on Arthurlie. Lithgow replaced Kane and Gibson took over the centre forward’s position from Lipton. The home side were quickly into their stride and scored within five minutes, although Anderson then Brander had the Sons in the lead before half time. No further scoring took place, and Dumbarton took the win 2-1 and both points.

On 11 December Albion Rovers came to Boghead to fulfil their return league fixture. Lipton was the only change coming back in place of Hill. Both teams played well on a difficult surface and had chances with no scoring taking place at half time. Rovers lost a player due to injury and played the whole of the second half with 10 men, but Dumbarton failed to find a way through and the game ended in a 0-0 draw.

A week later it was a trip to Falkirk to play East Stirling in the league. O’Neil returned to the defence as did captain Hill to the attack. The game started in favour of the Sons with Gibson scoring twice to give Dumbarton an early 2-0 lead. The Shire came back to score their first goal and shortly thereafter Brander was injured and could take no further part in the game. Just before the interval East Stirling equalised. The ten-man Dumbarton side could not prevent a further shire goal and the game was lost by 3-2.

On Christmas Day Dumbarton were in Fife to play their league fixture against Cowdenbeath. The only change to the team was Lipton returning at centre half. The first goal was a strange one as a Cowdenbeath player was charged and the whistle went. Everyone stopped apart from Hill who ran on and scored easily. Despite protests the score stood. Then before the interval Brander scored. Although the Fifers came back with a goal Speedie wrapped things up from a penalty for a 3-1 win.

The final game of the year was a benefit for long-serving player Bob Gordon against Vale of Leven on 31 December. The game was won by the Vale by 1-0.

As 1909 came to an end Dumbarton had improved another place in the league to 10th with 12 points from 12 games – Raith were still top with 23 points.

January
On New Year’s Day Dumbarton welcomed league leaders Raith Rovers to Boghead. Gordon replaced Lipton in an otherwise unchanged team. The Sons had an easy time of it and were 4-0 up by half time – captain Hill adding another 2 to his season’s total. Due to injury Raith played all of the second half with 10 men, but despite continued pressure their defence held firm, and late in the game scored a consolation goal from the penalty spot.

Two days later Dumbarton Harp were the visitors to Boghead in a county cup tie. On the day goals by Hill and Speedie were sufficient for a 2-1 win.

On 5 January Dumbarton played at Renton in a benefit match for one of the Renton players and with both sides playing under strength teams the home side came out on top 4-3.

After their New Year games, Dumbarton’s next competitive match was at home on 15 January in the league against Leith Athletic. New signing Alister Gordon (ex Hearts) was introduced on the right wing. Dumbarton started the better and were a goal ahead at the interval. The pressure from the Sons continued until 15 minutes from the end when both Ritchie and Urquhart had to retire injured. Leith took full advantage and scored late on for a 1-1 draw.

A week later Dumbarton faced their toughest challenge for a number of years as Celtic were the visitors in the first round of the Scottish Cup. A team reshuffle was required to accommodate the cup-tied Urquhart with Muirhead returning. The Sons showed up well in the early stages and only a goalkeeping mistake by McCormick had the Celts a goal ahead at the interval. In the second half Dumbarton pushed forward, and new boy Alister Gordon pulled them level. But just as a draw seemed likely Celtic scored a late winner.

Dumbarton’s league match against Ayr on 29 January was postponed due to bad weather.

So at the end of January Dumbarton continued to climb the league table – now in 7th place with 15 points from 14 matches played. Raith remained leaders with 23 points.

February
On 5 February Ayr Parkhouse were at Boghead to fulfil their first league fixture of the season against Dumbarton. Forrester and Urquhart took the places of injured McCormick and Hill. The game turned out to be an easy one for the Sons who were two ahead within 6 minutes. A penalty just before half time was followed by two more in the second half for a comprehensive 5-0 victory.

A week later Dumbarton travelled to Paisley to play Abercorn in the league. Speedie made way for the returning Hill. In the first half the play was fairly even, but the Sons managed to reach the interval with a 2-1 lead. The second half however was all Abercorn as they added four goals for a 5-2 win. 

St Bernards were the visitors to Boghead on 19 February for their return league match. After the previous week’s showing changes were made with McCormick, Speedie and Kane returning to the team. During the game, a howling gale blew down the pitch. It was not until 15 minutes from the end that Dumbarton, playing with the wind, scored the winner.

On 26 February the return fixture against Ayr Parkhouse was played. Lipton and Ritchie returned to the team. Only three weeks previously the Sons had easily disposed of the Parkies at Boghead, but nevertheless Parkhouse produced the performance of their season so far. Despite going a goal down early on, they played confidently throughout and went on to win 4-2.

February ended with Dumbarton improving to 6th place in the league with 19 points from 18 games played. Still it was Raith at the top with 26 points.

March
Dumbarton played their third county cup fixture on 5 March at Boghead against cup holders Renton. Bob Gordon and Speedie returned to the team. The match was a tough encounter with the referee having a busy time. Half time arrived goalless but Hill put the Sons ahead after 65 minutes. Shortly thereafter the Sons were awarded a penalty, and so infuriated was the Renton half back that he kicked the ball away. When he refused to retrieve it he was ordered from the field. The penalty kick was scored, and a third late in the game gave Dumbarton a 3-0 win.

On 12 March Dumbarton travelled to Edinburgh to play Leith Athletic in the league. The only change to the team was Urquhart taking Brander’s place at inside right. A bright start by the Sons was rewarded by an Alister Gordon goal and this lead was held till just before half time when Leith equalised.  The home team opened the second half strongly and went ahead early on. Dumbarton’s problems were increased when Ritchie retired from the field injured, and despite chances at both ends the game finished at 2-1 in favour of Leith.

A week later Dumbarton were on their travels again this time to play Ayr in their return league fixture. The selectors refreshed the attack line with Brander, Urquhart and Gibson coming back into the team. The Sons had already beaten Ayr twice during the season, but it was to be third time lucky for Ayr, and with an early goal the home side dominated the play to run out 3-1 winners.

Dumbarton played their first away tie in the county cup competition on 26 March with a game against Vale of Leven. Bob Gordon returned to left back whilst Ritchie came back on the left wing. The game was a close contest from start to finish, but Dumbarton found the Vale keeper unbeatable, and the game ended in a 0-0 draw.

The league at the end of the month showed new leaders with Leith Athletic taking over at the top with 30 points. Dumbarton had slipped to 7th with 19 points from the 20 matches played.

April
Dumbarton played their penultimate league match at home against Cowdenbeath on 2 April. Lipton and Urquhart were back in the team in place of Lithgow and Alister Gordon. Speedie scored in the first half for the Sons but later had to retire injured. In the second half Dumbarton also lost Ritchie to injury, but the nine men held out for a 1-0 win, with Cowdenbeath missing a late penalty.

After a free weekend, Dumbarton returned to county cup qualification with the return tie against Vale of Leven at Boghead. Alister Gordon took injured Ritchie’s place in the team. The Sons led twice in the first half only for the Vale to equalise both times but in the second half a further two goals for Dumbarton settled the issue for a 4-2 win.

The following Tuesday evening Dumbarton visited Meadow Park for the return county cup fixture against Dumbarton Harp. Lithgow and Gibson returned to the team that fought out a goalless draw.

Then two days later the final qualifying tie of the county cup was played against Renton at Tontine Park.  Having already booked their place in the final Dumbarton played a couple of trialists and in the end lost their first game of the competition. 

On 23 April the final league game of the season was played at Boghead against East Stirling. Ritchie returned from injury and Gibson was also brought back into the team. While the Shire equalised an early Hill goal, from then on it was all Dumbarton as they piled on four more goals before East Stirling scored a late consolation – the game ending in a 5-2 win. The result raised Dumbarton to finish in 4th place with 23 points from their 22 games.

The final game of the season took place on 30 April at Tontine Park. Dumbarton Harp were the opponents in the county cup final. The Harp had been having a great season doing well in both the Qualifying and Consolation Cups while at the same time had won the Union league. Dumbarton fielded a full strength team. No goals were scored by half time, despite numerous chances for both sides. Hill opened the scoring for Dumbarton but the Harp came back and scored twice before the final whistle and so for the fifth successive season Dumbarton were runners up.

May
Leith Athletic won the Second Division title but decided not to put their names forward for election to the top fight. Dumbarton, along with runners up Raith Rovers, Ayr and Abercorn went into the election together with Morton having finished second to bottom of the First Division. Port Glasgow Athletic had finished at the bottom and resigned from the league with Raith taking their place – full results as follows:

Match results

Scottish League

Scottish Cup

Scottish Qualifying Cup

Dumbartonshire Cup

League table

Friendlies and other matches

Player statistics

|}

Source:

Transfers

Players in

Players out 

Source:

In addition Edward Kane, John O'Neill and Daniel Forrester played their final 'first XI' games in Dumbarton colours.

References

Dumbarton F.C. seasons
Scottish football clubs 1909–10 season